Aéropostale (formally, Compagnie générale aéropostale) was a pioneering aviation company which operated from 1918 to 1933. It was founded in 1918 in Toulouse, France, as Société des lignes Latécoère, also known as Lignes aeriennes Latécoère or simply "The Line" (La ligne).

History 

Aéropostale founder Pierre-Georges Latécoère envisioned an air route connecting France to the French colonies in Africa and South America. The company's activities were to specialise in, but were by no means restricted to, airborne postal services.

Between 1921 and 1927 the "Line" operated as Compagnie générale d'entreprises aéronautiques (CGEA). In April 1927 Latécoère, having troubles with its planes, damaged due to long flights to South America, decided to sell 93% of his business to another Brazilian-based French businessman named Marcel Bouilloux-Lafont. On that basis Bouilloux-Lafont then founded the Compagnie générale aéropostale, better known by the shorter name Aéropostale.

On December 25, 1918, the company began serving its first route between Toulouse and Barcelona in Spain. In February 1919 the line was extended to Casablanca. By 1925 it extended to Dakar, where the mail was shipped by steamer to South America. In November 1927 regular flights between Rio de Janeiro and Natal were started. Expansion then continued to Paraguay and in July 1929 a regularly scheduled route across the Andes Mountains to Santiago, Chile, was started, later extending down to Tierra del Fuego on the southern part of Chile. Finally, on May 12–13, 1930, the trip across the South Atlantic by air finally took place: a Latécoère 28 mail plane fitted with floats and a  Hispano-Suiza engine made the first nonstop flight. Aeropostale pilot Jean Mermoz flew  from Dakar to Natal in 19 hours, 35 minutes, with his plane holding  of mail.

The company was dissolved in 1932 and merged with a number of other aviation companies (Air Orient, Société Générale de Transport Aérien, Air Union, and Compagnie Internationale de Navigation) to create Air France.

Aéropostale pilots 

Developed in the aftermath of World War I, air mail service owed much to the bravery of its earliest pilots. During the 1920s, every flight was a dangerous adventure, and sometimes fatal. The period was eloquently described by the French writer Antoine de Saint-Exupéry – himself an Aéropostale pilot – in his novel Vol de Nuit ("Night Flight"), in which he describes a postal flight through the skies of South America.

Aéropostale's roster of pilots included such aviation legends as:
 Jean Mermoz
 Antoine de Saint-Exupéry
 Henri Guillaumet
 Marcel Reine
 Emile Lécrivain
 Pierre Deley
 Henri Larrieu (1893 – 1974)
 Raymond Vanier

Aircraft 

Among the aircraft operated by the company were:
 Blériot 5190
 One hundred Breguet 14s
 Farman F.70, for passenger and mail routes between Casablanca and Dakar and also from Algiers to Biskra.
 Latécoère 26
 Latécoère 28

Film 

 Night Flight (1933 film), a 1933 film starring Clark Gable, was based on the novel by Antoine de Saint Exupéry, which recounted his real life experiences when he managed and flew for the Aeroposta Argentina subsidiary in South America. In the movie the airline was given the fictitious name Trans-Andean European Air Mail.
 In 1995, Futuroscope paid homage to Aéropostale pilot Henri Guillaumet with a 3D IMAX film by Jean-Jacques Annaud, in Wings of Courage (les Ailes du Courage), chronicling the pilot's crash on the frozen lake surface of Laguna del Diamante in the Andes, while flying mail for the South American subsidiary, Aeroposta Argentina. Guillaumet was portrayed by Craig Sheffer, Antoine de Saint-Exupéry by Tom Hulce, and Jean Mermoz played by Val Kilmer.

See also 

Aéropostale, a U.S. apparel outlet that took its name and some of its design cues from the Compagnie générale aéropostale.
Aeropostal Alas de Venezuela, normally referred to as just Aeropostal, an airline in Venezuela, established after the government took over air routes previously operated by the French Aéropostale
Aeroposta Argentina, a subsidiary in Argentina.

References 

 Citations

 Bibliography

 Mary, Jack. "Aéropostale, les autres lignes: Algérie, Paraguay, Patagonie, Bolivie, Venezuela", 2012, 
 Binder, Yves Marc & Sophie. "Aéropostale, les carnets de vol de Léopold", 2009, 
 de Bure, Guillemette. "Les secrets de l’Aéropostale: Les années Bouilloux-Lafont 1926-1944", 2007, 
 Daurat, Didier. "Dans le vent des hélices, témoignage du mythique directeur de la Ligne", passé à la postérité sous le nom de Rivière dans les pages de Vol de nuit
 Fleury, Jean-Gérard. "La Ligne", ouvrage de référence sur l'Aéropostale rédigé par un journaliste passionné d'aviation et collaborateur de l'industriel René Couzinet
 Hanson, Patricia King (Executive Editor) and Alan Gevinson (Associate Editor). The American Film Institute Catalog of Motion Pictures Produced in the United States: 1931-40, Feature Films. Berkeley, California: University of California Press, 1993. .
 Mermoz, Jean Mes Vols (Flammarion, 1937), regroupement posthume de textes du pilote et d'hommages de ses collègues, amis et admirateurs
 Poivre d'Arvor, Patrick et Olivier. "Courriers de nuit", Place des Victoires, 2003, Mengès, 2004 ; LGF Le Livre de Poche, 2006 (version texte seulement)

External links 

 Latecoere and "the Line"
 Timetables

 
Defunct airlines of France
Airlines established in 1918
Airlines disestablished in 1932
1932 mergers and acquisitions
1932 disestablishments in France
French companies established in 1918